K. S. Sowmya (18 July 1972 – 17 April 2004), better known by her stage name Soundarya, was an Indian actress who worked predominantly in Telugu films and has also worked in Kannada, Tamil, Hindi and Malayalam films. She was regarded as one of the greatest actresses in the history of Telugu Cinema and the most Successful actress after yesteryear's superstar Mahanati Savitri. In 2002, she received the National Film Award for Best Feature Film as a producer for the Kannada film Dweepa. She has also received Three Nandi Awards, Two Karnataka State Film Awards for Best Actress and Six Filmfare Awards South for her performances in films such as Ammoru (1994), Pavitra Bandham (1996), Anthahpuram (1998), Raja (1999), Doni Saagali (1998), Dweepa (2002) and Apthamitra (2004).

Personal life and education 
Soundarya was born and brought up in a Kannada
Brahmin family in Bangalore, Karnataka. Her parents are K. S. Sathyanarayana and Manjula.
Her father was a Kannada film writer and producer. She discontinued her M.B.B.S. after her first year in Bangalore. Soundarya's birthdate has been reported inconsistently by the media. While some sources indicate the birthdate as 18 July 1972, the others including The Times of India stated it to be 18 July 1976. 

On 27 April 2003, she married G. S. Raghu, a software engineer by profession.

Career

Early career
Soundarya's first movie was the Kannada film Baa Nanna Preethisu, directed by S. Siddalingaiah, released in April 1992, immediately followed by Gandharva in July 1992. In the same year, she acted in the Telugu movie Raithu Bharatham, with Krishna, directed by Tripuraneni Sriprasad alias Varaprasad. She acted in more than 100 movies, predominantly in Telugu, in a span of 12 years.

She began with lead roles in Kannada, her mother tongue, and went on to become the most popular actress in Telugu films. Her first film in Telugu was Rajendrudu Gajendrudu, directed by S. V. Krishna Reddy. Real commercial recognition came to her with Hello Brother (1994), directed by E. V. V. Satyanarayana, in which she starred alongside Nagarjuna and Ramya Krishna. She played an award-winning role in Ammoru, directed by Kodi Ramakrishna, starring alongside Ramya Krishna and Suresh and played the role of Bhavani, a devotee of Goddess Ammoru.  She had eleven releases in 1995.
In Tamil, she got major acclaim for her debut film Ponnumani, opposite Karthik and Sivakumar for playing the role of a mentally disabled person.

Continuous success, critical acclaim and popularity (1995–2002)
According to D. Ramanaidu, the "Most Beautiful Pairs of Telugu cinema" are NTR and Savitri, ANR and Vanisri, Chiranjeevi and Vijayashanti, Daggubati Venkatesh and Soundarya.

In 1997, she continued her successful run with Pavitra Bandham, Pelli Chesukundam, Amma Donga,  Maa Aayana Bangaram, Osi Na Maradala and Aaro Pranam, winning acclaim from all over the industry for her performances. She also starred alongside South Indian superstar Rajinikanth in Arunachalam, which became the highest-grossing film of 1997 in Tamil cinema. This stardom made her come out of the shadow of mainstream heroines and she chose scripts which had a wide potential of performance even alongside big stars which was clearly reflected in her movies. Though the industry regarded her to be the golden hand, as a former director's daughter, she always regarded the success not as a one-man show, but teamwork across 36 departments.

In 1998 the critical success of Choodalani Vundi, directed by Gunasekhar, opposite Chiranjeevi took her to the pinnacle. She also starred alongside Kamal Haasan and Prabhudeva in Kaathala Kaathala in Tamil in the same year, dubbed in Telugu as Navvandi Lavvandi, directed by Singeetam Srinivas Rao. Pelli Peetalu and Sri Ramulayya, Ninne Premistha in Telugu and Doni Saagali in Kannada were commercially successful. Anthahpuram, directed by Krishna Vamsi, stood as one of the finest performances of Soundarya in her career, winning her a State Nandi Award for Best Actress and also her second consecutive Filmfare Award for Best Actress.

Her 1999 release Raja, opposite Venkatesh, was another blockbuster and won her a third Filmfare Award.  Her other releases, Padayappa opposite Rajinikanth, Azad opposite Nagarjuna and Premaku Velayera, Premaku Swagatam and Arundhati further solidified her position. In the same year, she starred opposite Amitabh Bachchan in the Hindi movie Sooryavansham.

In 2000, she starred in Annayya, opposite Chiranjeevi, Jayam Manadera and Devi Putrudu opposite Venkatesh, Ninne Premistha, opposite Nagarjuna and Srikanth and several others that displayed her acting abilities, such as Eduruleni Manishi and Sri Manjunatha opposite Chiranjeevi, Arjun Sarja, Ambareesh and Sumalatha and Narasimha, opposite Rajinikanth and Ramyakrishna, Pelli Peetalu, Dongata and Nagadevatha. She also made guest appearances in songs - with Akkineni Nageswara Rao in Mayabazar, directed by Dasari Narayana Rao, in Adhipathi, with Nagarjuna and in Shubhalagnam, with Ali. Later after the entry of the next generation, her market was slowed down.

In 2004 Balakrishna announced the remake of Nartanasala, and a launch event was held in Hyderabad. Soundarya was signed to play Draupadi but the film was shelved following her death.

She worked with almost all the top directors, like Dasari Narayana Rao, K. Raghavendra Rao, Singeetam Srinivasa Rao, A. Kodandarami Reddy, Priyadarshan, Girish Kasaravalli, S. V. Krishna Reddy, K. S. Ravikumar, Krishna Vamsi, Kodi Ramakrishna, E. V. V. Satyanarayana, Muthyala Subbaiah, Gunasekhar, P. Vasu, Muppalaneni Shiva, Bharathi Kannan, Sundar C.

She starred opposite all major actors: with Super star Krishna in 5 movies, Mega star Chiranjeevi in 4 Telugu and 1 Kannada movie, Mohanlal in 1 movie, Nagarjuna in 5 movies, Venkatesh in 8 movies, Jagapathi Babu in 7 movies, Mohan Babu in 5 movies, Rajashekar in 5 movies, Suman in 3 movies, Harikrishna in 2 movies, Srikanth, Saikumar in 5 movies, Rajendra Prasad in 4 movies and Nandamuri Balakrishna in one movie. She has also acted with several other heroes such as Vinod Kumar, Naresh, Suresh, Harish, Abbas, Vineeth, Vadde Naveen, Ramesh Babu, Avinash, Bhanu Chander and J. D. Chakravarthy.

In Tamil, she collaborated with superstar Rajinikanth for 2 movies, Kamal Haasan for one movie, Karthik for 2 movies, Arjun Sarja for 1 movie, Vijaykanth for 2 movies and Parthiban for 2 movies. She has also acted opposite Vikram, Anand, Rehman, Eeramana Rojave Shiva, and shared screen space with Shivaji Ganesan in Padayappa.

Kannada film Career

In Kannada, she has acted with Vishunuvardhan, Anant Nag, Ravichandran, Shashikumar, Ramesh Arvind and Avinash. In 1996, she acted in the musical blockbuster Sipayi, along with Ravichandran and Chiranjeevi, dubbed in Telugu as Major. In 2002, she received the National Film Award for Best Feature Film (producer) for Dweepa. She also acted with Ambareesh in Sri Manjunatha. Her last film was Apthamitra, a runaway hit starring Vishnuvardhan and Ramesh Arvind. The film won her the Filmfare Award for Best Actress posthumously in 2004.

Other languages
Soundarya acted in the Hindi film Sooryavansham, opposite Amitabh Bachchan. She starred in several Tamil super-hits including Arunachalam and Padayappa with Rajinikanth and Kaadhala Kaadhala, with Kamal Haasan. She has acted in the Malayalam film Kilichundan Mampazham, with Mohanlal and Sreenivasan and Yathrakarude Sradhakku with Jayaram.

Tv Debut
Soundarya was about to make her Tv Debut with the successful Tamil Tv series Kolangal, Although she was interested, she was unable to join the crew due to her 2-month contract with the Bharatiya Janata Party to support them during election campaign. So, she was replaced by actress Devyani.

Philanthropy 
Soundarya had opened 3 schools for orphaned children in her native village Ganjigunte, in Mulbagal (Kolar). She was known as the only actress in the 90s from South India who had shown keen interest in social service, and had done many voluntary activities to help the Underprivileged. After Soundarya's death, her mother Manjula started more schools and orphanages under the name "Amarsoundarya Vidyalayas" & Amara Soundarya Foundation For Children with special needs in Bangalore.

Death 
On 17 April 2004, Soundarya died in an aircraft crash along with her brother Amarnath while travelling to Karimnagar from Bangalore during an election campaign to support Bharatiya Janata Party, which she had joined that year.

The aircraft, a Cessna 180, took off at 11:05 a.m. and turned west before crashing on the campus of the Gandhi Krishi Vigyan Kendra of the University of Agricultural Sciences. B. N. Ganapathi, one of the two persons working on the experimental fields of the university, who rushed to the aircraft to save the occupants, said the plane wobbled before the crash.

Awards and nominations

References

External links 
 
 The New York Times article

1972 births
2004 deaths
Actresses from Bangalore
People from Kolar district
Actresses in Malayalam cinema
Kannada actresses
Indian film actresses
Actresses in Kannada cinema
Actresses in Telugu cinema
Actresses in Tamil cinema
Victims of aviation accidents or incidents in India
Victims of aviation accidents or incidents in 2004
Filmfare Awards South winners
Nandi Award winners
Indian women film producers
Kannada film producers
Film producers from Bangalore
20th-century Indian actresses
21st-century Indian actresses
Businesswomen from Karnataka
Producers who won the Best Feature Film National Film Award